Empogona africana is a species of plant in the family Rubiaceae. It is endemic to South Africa.  It is threatened by habitat loss.

References

Sources

Flora of South Africa
Empogona
Vulnerable plants
Taxonomy articles created by Polbot
Plants described in 1907